Westward is a small village and civil parish in the English county of Cumbria. It had a population of 814, at the 2001 census, increasing slightly to 838 at the 2011 Census.  Westward is located on the south side of the Wiza Beck. It is 3.3 miles (5.3 km) to the south of the town of Wigton. Administratively it forms part of the district of Allerdale.

The Nobel prize winner William Henry Bragg was born in Westward in 1862.

See also

Listed buildings in Westward, Cumbria

References

External links 

 Cumbria County History Trust: Westward (nb: provisional research only – see Talk page)
Westward.org

Villages in Cumbria
Allerdale
Civil parishes in Cumbria